Cogan is a surname of Gaelic origin (not to be confused with the surname Kogan of Russian-Jewish origin). Notable people with the surname include:

Alma Cogan (1932–1966), English singer
Andrew Cogan, 17th-century agent of the English East India Company
Barry Cogan (footballer) (born 1984)
Barry Cogan (politician) (born 1936)
Brian Cogan (born 1954)
David G. Cogan (1908–1993), American ophthalmologist
Dean Cogan (1826–1872), Irish priest and writer
Fanny Cogan (1866–1929), American actress
Frank Cogan (born 1944), Irish Gaelic footballer
Henri Cogan (1924–2003), French actor and stuntman
Kevin Cogan (born 1956), American Formula 1 driver
Maggie Cogan (born 1943), American horse and carriage driver
Patrick Cogan (1903–1977), Irish politician
Philip Cogan (1750–1833), Irish composer
Pierre Cogan (1914–2013), French cyclist
Robert Cogan (born 1930), American composer and music theorist
Sara Cogan, English actress
Thomas Cogan (1736–1818), English physician and writer
Tony Cogan (born 1976), American baseball player
William H. F. Cogan (1823–1894), Irish politician
William N. Cogan (1856-1943), American dentist, naval officer, and dean of Georgetown University School of Dentistry

See also
Cogan, Vale of Glamorgan, A suburb of Penarth in South Wales
Cogan railway station, serving Cogan, Vale of Glamorgan.
Cogan House Township, Pennsylvania, a township in Lycoming County
Cogan House Covered Bridge in the township
Cogan syndrome, a rare disorder